The women's 1000 metres in short track speed skating at the 2002 Winter Olympics took place from 20 to 23 February at the Salt Lake Ice Center.

Records
Prior to this competition, the existing world and Olympic records were as follows:

The following new Olympic records were set during this competition.

Results

Heats
The first round was held on 20 February. There were eight heats, with the top two finishers moving on to the quarterfinals.

Heat 1

Heat 2

Heat 3

Heat 4

Heat 5

Heat 6

Heat 7

Heat 8

Quarterfinals
The quarterfinals were held on 23 February. The top two finishers in each of the four quarterfinals advanced to the semifinals.

Quarterfinal 1

Quarterfinal 2

Quarterfinal 3

Quarterfinal 4

Semifinals
The semifinals were held on 23 February. The top two finishers in each of the two semifinals qualified for the A final, while the third and fourth place skaters advanced to the B Final.

Semifinal 1

Semifinal 2

Finals
The five qualifying skaters competed in Final A, while two other raced for 6th place in Final B.

Final A

Final B

References

Women's short track speed skating at the 2002 Winter Olympics
Women's events at the 2002 Winter Olympics